Les Déesses (French: the goddesses) were a French zouk and R&B girl group best known for their 2007 summer hit "On a changé".

History 

Les Déesses originally come from the Caribbean and Africa. Lylah's parents come from Martinique and Guadeloupe, Edene's parents come from Guadeloupe and Philypa is from Cameroon. The three girls met on a dance casting and decided to form a tropical music and R&B group.

In July 2007, the group released a first single, "On a changé" (We have changed), which debuted at #9 on the SNEP Single Charts and peaked at #5. It stayed in the Top 100 for 21 weeks.

A second single, "Danse avec moi" (Dance with me) was announced for November, but the physical release was cancelled.

On October 29, their debut album "Saveurs exotiques" (Exotic flavours) was released, and in February 2008, a third single with the same name peaked at #11 on the French Single Charts.

On March 8, they gave a concert at the Bataclan in Paris, where they were joined onstage by Amine and Singuila.

In July 2008, the group announced their separation due to disagreements with their producers. Lylah started a solo career, releasing a single, "Ne t'arrête pas" (Don't stop) and an album, "Avec ou sans toi" (With or without you). Phylipa also recorded a song, "We Gonna Fight".

Name 

"Les Déesses" is French for "The Goddesses". Every member of the group represents one goddess:

 Lylah, the lead singer, represents Venus, the Ancient Roman goddess of beauty and love, because "she is a rare pearl with a sweet and warm voice which perfectly reveals her personality".
 Edene represents Diana, the Roman goddess of the hunt, because "she is ambitious and dynamic and her beauty and charm confer her a particular ease on stage".
 Philypa incarnates Minerva, the Roman goddess of wisdom, science and art, because "she is suave and reserved and totally reveals herself on stage".

Discography

Albums

Singles 

1 French Digital Charts
2 Belgian (Wallonia) Singles Chart

External links
 Official MySpace page
 Official skyrock page
 Interview on afrik.com

References

Zouk musicians
French girl groups
French musical trios